T. K. Hamza (born 14 July 1937) is an Indian politician. He was born in Koorad of Wandoor Panchayat. He completed his BA from University of Delhi and BL from Government Law College, Ernakulam. He joined the Manjeri Bar in 1968. He was the Minister for Public Works of the 8th Kerala Legislative Assembly, from 1987 to 1991. He was a member of the 14th Lok Sabha, representing the Manjeri constituency of Kerala and is a member of the Communist Party of India (Marxist) (CPI(M)) political party. Presently the Chairman of Wakf Board, Kerala

Positions Held and details
Minister for Works, Wakf, Haj and Inland Navigation from 02-04-1987 to 17-06-1991.

Member, Lok Sabha (2004-2009).

Chairman, Committee on Public Accounts (1991–93),  Committee of Privileges (1996–98), & (1998-01).

Government Chief Whip (1996-01); General Secretary, District Youth Congress, Kozhikode; President, DCC, Malappuram; Joined INC in 1957 and served in Youth Congress and INTUC; Joined CPI (M) in 1984; District Committee Member, CPI (M).
His website: http://tkhamza.com/

External links
 Members of Fourteenth Lok Sabha - Parliament of India website
 Members of Kerala Legislature

Communist Party of India (Marxist) politicians from Kerala
Living people
1937 births
20th-century Indian Muslims
India MPs 2004–2009
Lok Sabha members from Kerala
Manjeri
People from Malappuram district